Lochmaeus is a genus of moths of the family Notodontidae first described by Edward Doubleday in 1841.

Species
Lochmaeus manteo Doubleday, 1841
Lochmaeus bilineata  (Packard, 1864)

References

Notodontidae